Thapelo Ketlogetswe (born 12 February 1991) is a Botswana athlete competing primarily in the 400 metres. He participated in the 4 × 400 metres relay at the 2013 World Championships without qualifying for the final.

His personal best in the event is 46.17 seconds set in Orapa in 2011.

Competition record

References

1991 births
Living people
Botswana male sprinters
World Athletics Championships athletes for Botswana